"Sanctuary" is a two-part episode, consisting of the sixth and seventh episodes of the first season of the TNT science fiction drama Falling Skies. The first part aired on July 17, 2011, and the second part aired on July 24, 2011. Part 1 was written by Joel Anderson Thompson and part 2 was written by Melinda Hsu Taylor, both episodes were directed by Sergio Mimica-Gezzan.

Plot

Part 1 
Anne, while examining a young boy, is held at gunpoint by the boy's father who asks for medicine. Anne fills up a bag with drugs but fights back. The man hits her and takes the bag. Tom, Weaver and Mike go after the family to convince them to stay. They fire back but are stopped by Terry Clayton, a member of the 7th Mass. The family runs away and gives back the medicine. Clayton meets with Tom, Weaver and Mike, all of whom seem to know him. Clayton tells them that the 7th Mass is no more as they were attacked by Skitters. Clayton tells them that he must take the kids of the 2nd Mass because Skitters are on their way and a move from the school is necessary. Tom is very reluctant against this move.

Margaret, while getting medication from Anne for her friend, Sarah, gives Anne a gun for future protection and offers a shooting lesson. Ben seems to be recovering well as he performs 102 push-ups without breaking a sweat. He tells Matt that the Skitters cared for the kids and weren’t monsters, but a family. Hal overhears this conversation, seeming concerned.

Hal addresses his concerns about Ben to Anne, telling her that Ben is like a different kid. Anne talks to Tom about Ben but Tom doesn’t see a problem with his son. Tom then tells her that he doesn’t want to take Clayton up on his offer. Jimmy asks Weaver if he can be put back in rotation. Weaver allows him to go on lookout with Parker. Anne takes Margaret up on her offer and goes shooting with her. Clayton talks to worried parents about his offer. He tells them that it is a “temporary measure”. Tom interjects, still seemingly against the idea.

Jimmy goes out on lookout with Parker, who sits alone in an abandoned school bus. A Mech quickly comes and kills Parker. The Mech’s fire alerts the soldiers. Jimmy is almost killed but manages to escape. Weaver, while looking for Jimmy, finds Parker’s body in the bus. Jimmy is attacked inside by a Skitter. Tom and Weaver hear him scream and they go to help. Before the Skitter can kill Jimmy, Weaver shoots it. Jimmy begins to cry and a reluctant Weaver comforts him.

Clayton talks to Weaver and Tom after the attack and tells them that the next attack could happen soon. Weaver tells Tom that Clayton’s offer has to be reconsidered. Tom agrees. Ben is verbally attacked by an angry citizen who calls him a “razor-back” and the Skitters are attacking because of kids like him. Hal defends his brother and threatens the man. Ben goes to see his father. Tom asks Ben if he is happy to be back and Ben tells him that he is. Ben tells his father that he wants to go with Clayton to ease his father’s burden. Tom then goes and speaks to parents of the 2nd Mass, telling them that he is allowing Ben and Matt to go with Clayton and urges everyone else to follow.

Ben looks at a picture of him and his family on holiday. He gives it to Hal and tells him that he can return it later. Later, Hal tells Tom that he wants to go with Clayton to look out for Ben and Matt. He tells Tom that the last time he saw his mother, she urged him and Ben to look out for each other. Hal says that he owes his mother the courtesy of keeping his promise. Outside the school, children of the 2nd Mass prepare to leave with Clayton. They go out on foot to a Ranch. Later that night, Eli, the young boy whose father attacked Anne, tells Clayton that he wants to see his parents. Clayton takes Eli to the woods where he is met by a “harnessed” girl who tells him that she can take Eli to his family. Eli becomes frantic as he notices her “harness”. A Skitter and a Mech come and shoot Eli unconscious. They communicate with Clayton using the girl. Clayton goes back to the Ranch, revealing an imprisoned Pope:  Clayton beat the information out of Pope on where to find the 2nd Mass and their kids.

Part 2 
The children of the 2nd Mass, now at Clayton's "Sanctuary" play a game of football (soccer). During an interval, Tessa, a member of the Sanctuary, is called by her father telling her to remember why the others are here. Later, Terry Clayton and Tessa's father go out to a hidden barn, where their prisoner, John Pope, is being held. Pope was forced to give up important information about the 2nd Mass, which allowed Clayton to win their trust. Clayton leaves and Pope, who has already used a piece of broken glass to cut the ropes that were binding him, knocks out Tessa's father but decides not to kill him. As he escapes he notices two dead bodies lying behind the barn.

Tom becomes frustrated as the 2nd Mass have received no word from Clayton in 48 hours, seen no sign of the 3rd Mass nor the escorts. Weaver isn't happy that Tom is leaving with Dai on motorbikes to look for the kids, but he orders the pair to return to base camp that night. Back at the Sanctuary, Lourdes spots a backpack belonging to Eli Russell, a child from the 2nd Mass whom Clayton lured into the forest in the previous episode. She secretly meets with Hal and Mike about the backpack she found. Mike states that he trusts Clayton, however he later searches the locked barn and finds a pile of Eli's clothes. Clayton finds him and pulls a gun on him. He tells Mike how horrible it was to witness the 7th Mass be taken down. Clayton says that one of the kids, a girl named Megan, fell behind and was taken by Skitters. After that, the aliens left his team alone for a week. Clayton describes the behavior as though the Skitters were thanking them for Megan, for handing over one of their own.  Clayton explains to Rick that like soldiers in a human army, each detachment of Skitters has its own assigned regions and sectors, and each has its own quotas to fill; in their case, the number of human children they are expected to capture and harness.  The force of Skitters that nearly wiped out the 7th Mass decided that if their quota was being met or even surpassed, it didn't really matter to them that the remaining handful of the 7th Mass and their families were still free.  So the Skitters offered Clayton an arrangement in which he'd collaborate with them, let the remnant of the 7th mass serve as a trap to quietly collect refugee human children, and in return the Skitters would leave his men and their families alone.

Mike decides that it's time for the 2nd Mass to leave the Sanctuary. Hal realizes that Tessa knew about the plan the entire time, and she alerts her father and the rest of the men that the sacrificial kids are escaping. They run into the night with only an armed Mike and Hal to defend the group, while Hal takes Rick and leads the rest of the kids to safety. Before they leave, Mike tells Rick how much he loves him. Clayton comes behind Mike with a gun. In the forest, Hal hears a gunshot, implying that Clayton killed Mike.

The next day, the 2nd Mass children wander into an unfamiliar area and break into an abandoned house. Ben believes he should move on ahead of the group, since he's not tired and can move faster. Hal agrees with his younger brother and tells him to follow the highway, back to the school base camp.
Tom and Dai spot Ben on the road, and Ben tells his father about what's going on.

The men from the Sanctuary have found Hal and children, and demand they give themselves up. Hal opens fire on the soldiers, while Lourdes leads the kids out the back. Pope defends Hal by shooting one of Clayton's men. He gets shot right before he notices Tom hiding among the trees. Tom walks up to the men and tells them that Porter is on the way. He offers himself as a hostage to spare the lives of the kids. He tells Hal to come out of the house, and they all become prisoners of Clayton's. They are escorted back to the Sanctuary but Weaver and other 2nd Mass soldiers have arrived. Clayton's and his men give up, but Clayton, in an attempt to kill Hal, is shot by Tom.

In the final scene, the 2nd Mass offer a military funeral for Mike, who sacrificed his own life to keep his son and the other children alive. Tom says a few words in honor of his slain friend, and Rick receives the folded American flag at the funeral. He tells Ben that its in mankind's nature to kill and that "we" would never do that, implying that Rick now identifies as part of the skitter race. He then turns to Ben and tells him that Ben should feel the same way.

Reception

Ratings 
In its original American broadcast, "Sanctuary Part 1" was seen by an estimated 4.27 million household viewers, according to Nielsen Media Research. The episode received a 1.4 rating among viewers between ages 18 and 49.

"Sanctuary Part 2" was seen by an estimated 4.07 million viewers. The episode received a 1.4 rating among viewers between ages 18 and 49.

Reviews 
Ryan McGee of The A.V. Club gave the episode an A−, stating, "OK, this? THIS? This is what Falling Skies should be, people. Maybe it’s an anomaly, and we’ll go back to mediocre basics next week. Maybe it’s the show finally learning what works and what doesn’t. Maybe it’s the story finally kicking into gear after weeks of world building. That television shows often come less than fully formed isn’t a revolutionary or unique observation. But when a show takes the leap from “having potential” to “living up to it,” that’s something great to behold. Again: there’s no guarantee that “Sanctuary, Part 1” is the new base standard for Falling Skies. But if it were to be that standard? I’d stand up and declare myself a fan of a show that’s largely disappointed me up until this point."

In his review for Part 2, McGee gave the episode a lower score of C, stating, "Last week, I annoyed more than a few by declaring that Falling Skies had potentially turned a corner with “Sanctuary, Part 1.” I’m not in the habit of defending reviews or getting into the relatively arbitrary nature of grading individual episodes, but for those that have occasionally accused me of being a plant for a show they consider to be terrible, look no further than here to see that can’t possibly be true. Because if “Sanctuary, Part 1” showed the best elements of this show, than “Sanctuary, Part 2” amply demonstrated the show’s weakest aspects. The ideas are still solid, but the execution was put on autopilot for this hour."

References 

2011 American television episodes
Falling Skies (season 1) episodes